Geophilus impressus is a species of soil centipede in the family Geophilidae found all over Europe, and has also been recorded in North Africa (Maghreb, Morocco, and Tunisia). It lives frequently in endogean habitats; in Sardinia it's found mostly in Quercus ilex woods, but also in Mediterranean shrub, open habitats, and maquis. It lives anywhere from sea level to 1700 meters above it, sometimes in caves.

Description
G. impressus grows up to 40 millimeters, has between 43–63 leg pairs, and is yellowish-orange in color, with lappets on the first maxillae, stout tubercle with 1–2 apical tips on the pretarsus of the second maxillae, distinct carpophagus fossae on the anterior sternites, and a distinctive arrangement of the coxal pores of the last leg pair.

Taxonomy
G. impressus was found to be a senior synonym of both G. insculptus (Attems, 1895) and G. alpinus (Meinert, 1870). The latter is the more commonly used name, however the International Commission on Zoological Nomenclature prioritizes the use of G. impressus over any of its synonyms.

References 

impressus